Ray Bernabei (November 26, 1925 in New Castle, Pennsylvania – September 5, 2008 in Longwood, Florida) was a US. soccer fullback who played eleven seasons with the Harmarville Hurricanes. He was also a long time collegiate and professional referee.   He is a member of both the National Soccer Hall of Fame and the National Intercollegiate Soccer Officials Association (NISOA) Hall of Fame.

Player
Bernabei played as a youth player with the Indianolo Indians.  He attended Indiana University of Pennsylvania, playing and coaching soccer at the school from 1946 to 1950.  He was inducted into the school's Athletic Hall of Fame in 1996.  In 1949, he joined the semi-professional Harmarville Hurricanes.  He would play with Harmarville until his retirement in 1963.  During these years, Harmarville was a national powerhouse winning the 1952 and 1956 U.S. Open Cups, and finishing runner up in 1953.  Harmarville also lost in the finals of the 1950 and 1951 Amateur Cups.

Referee
Bernabei served as a collegiate and professional referee for forty-three years.  During this time, he officiated two NCAA finals.  He also served as the president and executive director of the National Intercollegiate Soccer Officials Association.

He was inducted into the National Intercollegiate Soccer Officials Association (NISOA) Hall of Fame in 1976, the National Soccer Hall of Fame in 1978, and received the Bill Jeffrey Award for outstanding service to intercollegiate soccer in 1985.  He died in Florida from complications related to non-Hodgkin's lymphoma.

References

External links
 National Soccer Hall of Fame
 Where Are They Now?
 Obituary

1925 births
2008 deaths
People from New Castle, Pennsylvania
American soccer coaches
American soccer players
American soccer referees
Harmarville Hurricanes players
National Soccer Hall of Fame members
IUP Crimson Hawks men's soccer players
Association football defenders